This is a list of wars involving the Republic of Tunisia and its predecessor states.

Hafsid dynasty (1229–1574)

Ottoman Tunis (1574–1705)

Beylik of Tunis (1705–1881)

French Tunisia (1881-1956)

Republic of Tunisia (1956-present)

See also

 Hilalian invasion of Ifriqiya
 Battle of Balaclava
 Battle of Monte Cassino
 Operation Wooden Leg

References
 Ian Fletcher and Natalia Ishchenko, The Crimean War: A Clash of Empires, Staplehurst Kent, 2004, p.159
 Laurence Oliphant: The Trans-Caucasian Campaign of the Turkish Army Under Omer Pasha, London, 1856
 Randier La Royale Editions Babouji 2006, 
 TIME: The Wages of Moderation (Jul. 28, 1961)
 Leaders: Crimée-Tunisie: le souvenir du contingent de 15 000 soldats de l'armée beylicale (13.03.2014)

 
Tunisia
Military history of Tunisia
Wars